Effluent Guidelines (also referred to as Effluent Limitation Guidelines (ELGs)) are U.S. national standards for wastewater discharges to surface waters and publicly owned treatment works (POTW) (also called municipal sewage treatment plants). The United States Environmental Protection Agency (EPA) issues Effluent Guideline regulations for categories of industrial sources of water pollution under Title III of the Clean Water Act (CWA). The standards are technology-based, i.e. they are based on the performance of treatment and control technologies (e.g., Best Available Technology). Effluent Guidelines are not based on risk or impacts of pollutants upon receiving waters.

Regulated pollutants range from acenaphthene to zinc, with maximum allowed contamination levels in discharge water (wastewater) varying by industry. The regulations cover pollutants for which there are approved analytical testing methods. EPA has published many methods in its regulations, and has approved the use of other methods published by peer-reviewed sources, such as Standard Methods. In the early years of the program (1970s-1980s) the agency published methods for a list of 126 "priority pollutants," consisting of various toxic pollutants. Subsequently the agency has issued methods and regulated pollutants beyond those in the initial priority list.

Since the mid-1970s, the EPA has promulgated ELGs for 59 industrial categories, with over 450 subcategories. Effluent Guidelines currently control pollution at approximately 40,000 facilities that discharge directly to the nation's waters, 129,000 facilities that discharge to POTWs, and construction sites. The regulations annually prohibit the discharge of 700 billion pounds of pollutants into U.S. surface waters. EPA periodically reviews the existing industrial regulations and occasionally updates an existing category or adds a new category.

Effluent Guidelines are implemented in water discharge permits issued to facilities through the National Pollutant Discharge Elimination System (NPDES).

See also
Industrial wastewater treatment
New Source Performance Standard
Water Quality Standards Program (Risk-based standards)

References

External links
EPA - Effluent Guidelines Program

Regulation in the United States
Water pollution in the United States
United States Environmental Protection Agency
Water law in the United States